Western Maryland Railroad Right-of-Way, Milepost 126 to Milepost 160 is a historic section of the Western Maryland Railway (WM) in Allegany County, Maryland, and Morgan County, West Virginia. It is an abandoned  section of the right-of-way between milepost 126 at the intersection of the Chesapeake and Ohio (C&O) Canal and Long Ridge Road, Woodmont, and milepost 160 just west of Maryland Route 51, North Branch. It closely parallels the Potomac River and the C&O Canal, which runs along the north bank of the river, and includes three tunnels. Seven miles of the roadbed are in West Virginia near Paw Paw.

WM completed the line between Hagerstown and Cumberland, Maryland in 1906. It was abandoned by the Chessie System in 1975.

The National Park Service acquired the roadbed in 1980 for the C&O Canal National Historical Park. It was listed on the National Register of Historic Places in 1981. Towns it is listed in include North Branch, Oldtown, Little Orleans and Woodmont, Maryland, and Jerome, West Virginia.

See also
Indigo Tunnel
Kessler Tunnel
Stickpile Tunnel

References

External links

, including photo from 1981, at Maryland Historical Trust

Buildings and structures in Allegany County, Maryland
Western Maryland Railway
Historic American Engineering Record in Maryland
Historic American Engineering Record in West Virginia
Buildings and structures in Morgan County, West Virginia
National Register of Historic Places in Morgan County, West Virginia
National Register of Historic Places in Allegany County, Maryland
Chesapeake and Ohio Canal National Historical Park
Rail infrastructure on the National Register of Historic Places in Maryland
Rail infrastructure on the National Register of Historic Places in West Virginia